Oracle Business Process Analysis (BPA) Suite is a group of Oracle Corporation software products that provide modeling and analysis of business processes.

The suite is based on the IDS Scheer software Architecture of Integrated Information Systems (ARIS) Design Platform after an agreement between the two organisations in 2006.

Components 
 Business Process Architect
 Business Process Repository
 Business Process Simulator
 Business Process Publisher

See also 
 Oracle SOA Suite

References

External links 
 

Oracle software